Adrian Barbullushi (born 12 December 1968) is a retired Albanian international football player.

Club career 
Barbullushi played for Ionikos F.C. in the Greek Alpha Ethniki during the 1992–93 and 1994–95 seasons. He also played for Ionikos in the Beta Ethniki during the 1993–94 season.

International career 
Barbullushi made his debut for Albania in a September 1990 friendly match against Greece and has earned a total of 5 caps, scoring no goals. He has represented his country in 1 FIFA World Cup qualification match.

His final international was an April 1992 FIFA World Cup qualification match against Spain.

References

External links 
 

1968 births
Living people
Albanian footballers
Association football midfielders
Albania international footballers
KF Vllaznia Shkodër players
Albanian expatriate footballers
Expatriate footballers in Greece
Egaleo F.C. players
Albanian expatriate sportspeople in Greece
Ionikos F.C. players